XHXW-FM is a radio station on 90.3 FM in Nogales, Sonora, Mexico. It is owned by Grupo Audiorama Comunicaciones and is known as KY (pronounced like "calle") with a variety format.

History
Roque Chávez Castro received the concession for XEXW on January 21, 1955; it signed on nearly three months later, on April 11. Chávez Castro, who primarily operated radio stations in Sinaloa, sold the station in 1977. Eventually, XEXW became a Radiorama-owned station and was spun off to Larsa when Radiorama exited many Sonora markets.

On May 10, 2019, XEXW became the last AM station in Nogales to move to FM as XHXW-FM 90.3, changing to the La Más Chingona brand already used by Larsa in Hermosillo and Ciudad Obregón. Six months later, in November, it changed to pop under the "Sin Límites" banner.

This station reverted to Radiorama control, until October 4, 2021, the station formally launched as KY 90.3, a brand new music format.

References

Radio stations in Sonora
1955 establishments in Mexico
Radio stations established in 1955